Adagio is a French progressive metal band formed in 2000 by guitarist Stéphan Forté.

History 
Since their third studio album Dominate, Adagio has evolved from their original power metal sound, but still adhering to their trademark elements of virtuosity and massive orchestral influences. With Dominate, they implemented a heavier sound with traditional death grunts.  Archangels in Black was the band's fourth album. The band has stated that the "compositions are the ultimate between melodic and extreme metal, and can be considered as a more brutal version of (their second album) Underworld".

In April 2016, Stéphan Forté created an Indiegogo campaign to help fund Adagio's fifth album, Life. The campaign ended on 5 June 2016, with the campaign reaching 148% of its goal. The album was expected to come out in December 2016 under Stéphan's own label, Zeta Nemesis. The release date was delayed to 26 July 2017 but the band premiered a song called "Darkness Machine" two months beforehand.

Forté announced an indefinite hiatus of Adagio in April 2018, in order to pursue his solo career.

Musical style 

Adagio's music is known by its technical precision and dark orchestration. Adagio keeps unique complex lead workings which are complemented with a powerful and driving rhythm section.

In their album Life, Adagio mixes progressive metal with eastern ethnic and djent influences.

Members 

Current
 Stéphan Forté – guitar (2000–present)
 Franck Hermanny – bass guitar (2000–present)
 Kévin Codfert – keyboards (2003–present)
 Kelly Sundown Carpenter – lead vocals (2011–present)
 Jelly Cardarelli – drums (2016–present)
 Mayline Gautié – violin (2016–present)

Former
 David Readman – vocals (2000–2004)
 Dirk Bruinenberg – drums  (2000–2004)
 Richard Andersson – keyboards (2000–2003)
 Éric Lebailly – drums (2004–2013)
 Gus Monsanto – vocals (2004–2008)
 Christian Palin – vocals (2008–2010)
 Guillaume Bergiron – drums (2016)

Touring
 Kelly Sundown Carpenter – vocals (2008)
 Mats Levén – vocals (2010–2011)

Timeline

Discography 

Studio albums
Sanctus Ignis (2001)
Underworld (2003)
Dominate (2005)
Archangels in Black (2009)
Life (2017)

Live albums
A Band in Upperworld (2004)

References

External links 

French power metal musical groups
French progressive metal musical groups
Musical groups established in 2000
Musical quartets
Organizations based in Montpellier
Musical groups from Occitania (administrative region)
Locomotive Music artists
Listenable Records artists